Mark Strikes Again (also known as The .44 Specialist) is a 1976 Italian poliziottesco film directed by Stelvio Massi. Originally planned as an original film, during the shoots and the post-production process it was turned into a second sequel of Mark of the Cop (after Mark Shoots First).

Cast 
 Franco Gasparri: Mark Patti
 John Saxon: Inspector Altman 
 Marcella Michelangeli: Olga Kuber 
 Giampiero Albertini: Inspector Mantelli 
 John Steiner: Paul Henkel 
 Paul Muller: Austrian Inspector 
 Malisa Longo: Isa

Production
Mark Strikes Again was filmed at Icet - De Paolis in Milan and on location in Rome.

Release
Mark Strikes Again was distributed theatrically in Italy by PAC on October 20, 1976. It grossed a total of 657,027,130 Italian lire domestically. The film was released as The .44 Specialist on home video in the Nederlands and Germany.

See also 
 List of Italian films of 1976

References

Sources

External links
 

1976 films
1970s Italian-language films
Poliziotteschi films
Films directed by Stelvio Massi
Films scored by Stelvio Cipriani
Films shot in Rome
1970s Italian films